Bukkhalo is a khwaeng (sub-district) of Thon Buri District, Bangkok. Its name is also the name of surrounding area.

Geography
Bukkhalo is the central area of the district.

The area is bounded by other subdistricts (from north clockwise): Talat Phlu and Bang Yi Ruea in its district (Ratchaphruek Road is a divider line), Samre in its district (Somdet Phra Chao Tak Sin Road is a divider line), Dao Khanong in its district (Ratchadaphisek Road is a divider line), respectively.

Places
The Mall Tha Phra
Wat Krachap Phinit
Bukkhalo Intersection (shares with Samre and Dao Khanong)
Wat Sutthawas
Somdet Phra Pin Klao Hospital
Pho Nimit BTS Station

Note: the local temple Wat  Bang Nam Chon, indeed, it is located in the area of neighbouring Samre.

References

Neighbourhoods of Bangkok
Subdistricts of Bangkok
Thon Buri district